Elachista merista is a moth of the family Elachistidae that is found in south-eastern Tasmania and Kangaroo Island in South Australia.

The forewings and hindwings are pale.

References

merista
Moths described in 2011
Endemic fauna of Australia
Moths of Australia
Taxa named by Lauri Kaila